Yiping Zhou (周一平; born 1955) is the Special Envoy of the Director-General of the World Women Organization (WWO) and Chief Advisor of the WWO  and was the United Nations Envoy on South-South Cooperation. Prior to this appointment of 30 May 2014 by United Nations Secretary-General Ban Ki-moon, Yiping Zhou served as the Director of the United Nations Office for South-South Cooperation (UNOSSC), where he led UN system-wide promotion and coordination of South-South cooperation in the global South.

He is also the Editor-in-Chief of Cooperation South – a development journal of the United Nations Development Programme.

Zhou has held a number of high-level positions with the United Nations. He served as deputy director and Senior Policy Adviser of the Special Unit for South-South Cooperation 1997–2004; Regional Programme Officer of UNDP's Regional Bureau for Asia and the Pacific (1992–1997); and Project Management Officer at the UN Office for Project Services (1985–1992).
Prior to joining the United Nations, Mr. Zhou worked as a policy officer in the Department of International Relations of the Ministry of Foreign Economic Relations and Trade of the Government of the People's Republic of China (1980–1984), and as diplomat in the Permanent Mission of China to the United Nations (1984–1985).

References

Further reading 

 Banerjee, Robin (2021). Corporate Frauds: Business Crimes now Bigger, Broader, Bolder, Sage Publishing. ISBN 9789354791628 
 Banerjee, Robin (2019). Who Blunders and How: The Dumb Side of the Corporate World, Sage Publishing. ISBN 9789353285791
 Boutros, Andrew S., Funk, T. Markus (2019). From Baksheesh to Bribery: Understanding the Global Fight Against Corruption and Graft, Oxford University Press. ISBN 9780190232405
 Cooper, Sam (2021). Wilful Blindness: How a Network of Narcos, Tycoons and CCP Agents Infiltrated the West, Optimum Publishing International. ISBN 9780888903143
 Faligot, Roger (2019). Chinese Spies: From Chairman Mao to Xi Jinping, Hurst Publishers. ISBN 9781787386044
 Liétar, Pauline (2017). ONU: la grande imposture, Albin Michel. 
 Kwok, Sharon I., Lo, T. Wing, Siegel, Dina (2019). Organized Crime and Corruption Across Borders: Exploring the Belt and Road Initiative, Routledge. 
 South-South Cooperation and Chinese Sun Kian Ip Group signs cooperation agreement, 7 March 2015, USA News Online
 On Petition for Writ of Certiorari to the United States Court of Appeals for the Second Circuit, Supreme Court of the United States, March 16, 2020
One of China's Richest Men Convicted in United Nations Bribery Case: Ng Lap Seng, a Chinese billionaire who wanted to build a U.N. facility in China that would be as big as the one in New York, was convicted of bribery, conspiracy and money laundering charges on Thursday, NBC News, July 27, 2017
Chinese billionaire Ng Lap Seng convicted in UN bribery case: Tycoon paid inducements to promote ‘Geneva of Asia’ project in Macau, FT, July 28, 2017
Chairman of Macau Real Estate Development Company Sentenced to Prison for Role in Scheme to Bribe United Nations Ambassadors to Build A Multi-Billion Dollar Conference Center, The United States Department of Justice, May 11, 2018

External links 

 South-South Cooperation and Chinese Sun Kian Ip Group Signs Cooperation Agreement 
Former United Nations General Assembly President Charged in Bribery Scheme
John William Ashe
UN body backed Macau deal in corruption case
U.N. Team Had Cleared Group at Center of Bribery Case: Officials met in April with Ng Lap Seng, didn’t detect any problems
Ng Lap Seng
China Tycoon Back Under U.S. Scrutiny: Congressional reports link Ng Lap Seng to past campaign-finance scandal
Macau Tycoon Gets 4 Years in Prison for Bribing U.N. Diplomats
US v NG LAP SENG
NG LAP SENG v US
 UN rejects US$15 million donation from Macau billionaire Ng Lap Seng pending bribery investigation

Chinese officials of the United Nations
Living people
1955 births